Mount Belumut, standing at , is a mountain located in Kluang District, Johor, Malaysia. For the average climber, the climb to the summit takes four to six hours and the return to the foot (by the same route) takes three to four hours.

Before reaching the summit of Gunung Belumut, climbers will first pass by a 'false summit', where overnight camping is possible in fair weather conditions. From the 'false summit', it's about half-an-hour's trek to the summit. A huge boulder, named the Crown Rock, sits on the summit. The boulder got its name because it looks like a giant crown.

Due to its popularity, some parts of the trail have been badly eroded by tourists. The campsite is also a bit dirty, as some climbers have left litter behind.

To get to Gunung Belumut, one has to get to Kluang, and take a cab from the bus terminal to Belumut (or Gunung Lumut as it is known locally).

Gallery

See also 
 Geography of Malaysia

References 

Kluang District
Belumut